High Beach (or High Beech) is a village inside Epping Forest in south-west Essex, England.

It is the location of Lippitts Hill and the Metropolitan Police Air Support Unit.

Elevations
Areas of the surrounding forest are also named High Beach or High Beech. However, individual smallholdings of land are given over to residential, agriculture and mixed uses, particularly beside the straight A-road which bisects it.
Many of the forest paths are naturally gravel-lined with underlying deposits of Bagshot Sands. It is believed that the name High Beach came from an early description of the localised sand and gravel exposure in this part of the forest.

The Church of the Holy Innocents

Holy Innocents church is surrounded by forest. It was built in 1873 by Thomas Charles Baring to
replace the earlier church (St Paul's) which was located in Church Road around 1 mile away from the present church's location and had fallen into disrepair. The new church was designed by the architect Arthur Blomfield in the Early English style at the cost of £5,500. It was consecrated in 1883 and became the parish church in 1884. The  tower and spire contains 13 hemispherical bells cast at the Whitechapel Bell Foundry.

Notable residents
In July 1837, poet John Clare's deteriorating mental disorder caused him to be admitted to the High Beach private asylum under the guidance of the enlightened Dr Matthew Allen.  The poet, after suffering from depression, was invited as a guest to Allen's asylum. Clare spent four years at the asylum before escaping in July 1841. Alfred, Lord Tennyson lived at Beech Hill House from 1837 to 1840. During his short stay he may well have encountered Clare and other inmates. Tennyson was reported by a journalist as being "...delighted with the mad people...the most agreeable and the most reasonable persons he has met with." The lawyer William St Julien Arabin lived at Beech House, later renamed Arabin House. The mixed martial arts pioneer Edward William Barton-Wright lived at The Lodge, High Beech, in 1932.

Culture and community

Amenities include the church, primary school, horse riding school and three pubs: the Duke of Wellington (now closed), The Kings Oak and The Owl.
Owned and managed by the London Borough of Waltham Forest, the Suntrap Forest Education Centre and The Field Studies Council Epping Forest Field Centre offers field studies and other activities to schools and other groups. 
Epping Forest Visitors Centre in Nursery Road is one of three visitor centres in the forest that provide learning, tours, exhibits and recreational facilities.

Sport and forest walks
In February 1928, an oval cinder circuit to the rear of the Kings Oak public house was the venue for Britain's first motorcycle speedway meeting.

Courses and appropriate tracks for outdoor pursuits include horse riding, mountain biking, orienteering and seasonally there are running events. The  Epping Forest Centenary walking route passes through the locality. The route was established in 1978 to celebrate the 100th anniversary of the passing of the Epping Forest Act 1878. Section 18 of the London Loop, a long distance footpath, can be joined at nearby Sewardstone.

In Mott Street the High Beach Cricket Club play in Division 4 of the Herts & Essex League.

Governance
The Local authority is Epping Forest District Council. Residents of High Beach fall into the Waltham Abbey High Beach Ward. Traditionally, the ward has been a Conservative safe seat.

In the late 2000s, there was a strong showing for Green Party - but they failed to accumulate enough votes to win the ward - the support for them has since diminished. In the 2019 Local Elections, the Conservatives won with 60% of the vote.

At Parliamentary level, the local Member of Parliament is Eleanor Laing of the Conservative Party. In 2017, she was re-elected with 31,462 votes	(62%). This was the highest numerical vote share for a 
Conservative candidate in 25 years.

Transport links
Road

Major roads A104, M25, A121 and the A112 pass through or close by to the locality.

Rail

London Transport

Bus

Arriva route 66 connects into Loughton and runs approximately hourly to the fringes of the village close to the Volunteer pub.

Further reading
 Foulds, A. The Quickening Maze. 2009 Jonathan Cape

Notes and references
Notes 
  
References

Villages in Essex
Waltham Abbey